Lesbian, gay, bisexual, and transgender Tennesseans face some legal challenges that non-LGBT Tennesseans do not. Same-sex sexual activity is legal in the state. Marriage licenses have been issued to same-sex couples in Tennessee since the Supreme Court ruling in Obergefell v. Hodges on June 26, 2015.

Sodomy law
The Tennessee Court of Appeals ruled unanimously that the state's sodomy statute was unconstitutional in 1996 in the case of Campbell v. Sundquist.

Recognition of same-sex relationships

Marriage
Prior to the Obergefell v. Hodges ruling by the U.S. Supreme Court, Tennessee recognized neither same-sex marriages nor any other form of same sex-unions. The state banned same-sex marriage both by statute and by constitutional amendment.

In March 2023, the state house passed HB 878 to allow government employees to refuse to solemnize a marriage that went against their personal beliefs.

House Bill 1111

Domestic partnership

The cities of Collegedale and Knoxville together with the Metropolitan Area of Nashville and Davidson County have enacted domestic partnership benefits for same-sex couples.  The Chattanooga City Council voted to allow domestic partnerships in 2013, but this was repealed by voters in August 2014.  However, same-sex marriages have been available throughout Tennessee since the June 2015 Supreme Court ruling overturning same-sex marriage bans nationwide.

Adoption and parenting
Tennessee allows single persons to adopt children. Same-sex couples may legally adopt in the state. In 2007, the Tennessee Attorney General released an opinion that no state law prohibited adoption by same-sex couples and that such adoptions could be made if in the child's best interest.

In January 2020, the Tennessee General Assembly, returning for its first session of the year, immediately passed a bill to allow adoption and welfare agencies to reject LGBTQ parents if the agency cited its “sincerely held religious beliefs." The exemption would protect the agencies from liability and lawsuits. 11 other US jurisdictions have similar laws. Governor Bill Lee signed the bill into law, and it took effect immediately.

Discrimination protections

State and federal
Tennessee law does not prohibit discrimination of the basis of sexual orientation and gender identity. Since 2020, the federal protections stemming from the Supreme Court's rulings in Bostock v. Clayton County and R.G. & G.R. Harris Funeral Homes Inc. v. Equal Employment Opportunity Commission have been available in Tennessee.

This was followed in January 2021 by executive orders from the Biden administration, enabling sanctions against schools and colleges that did not follow the directives of the Equal Employment Opportunity Commission or Department of Education on the protection of gay, lesbian and transgender students. Allowed actions against non-complying schools included legal action, civil penalties and withholding of federal funding. Twenty state-attorneys general joined a suit against enforcement of the executive order and on 15 July 15, 2022, a federal judge of the Eastern District of Tennessee issued a preliminary injunction, temporarily preventing the two agencies from enforcing their directives under the presidential order. The federal discrimination protections still apply in all twenty states, only the specific enforcements outlined in the executive order are temporarily blocked, pending continuing legal proceedings.

Local
The cities of Knoxville, Memphis, Franklin, Chattanooga and the Metropolitan Area of Nashville and Davidson County have ordinances prohibiting discrimination in public employment on the basis of sexual orientation and gender identity, but these ordinances do not apply to private employers. The Equal Access to Interstate Commerce Act blocks this from being enforced.

HB 563 
This "local preemption" bill would prevent government agencies from examining a business's anti-discrimination policies when deciding whether to hire that business for a taxpayer-funded contract. A scheduled vote in the Tennessee House was rescheduled from March 14, 2019 to March 21.

Equal Access to Intrastate Commerce Act

Senate Bill 1556

EEOC v. R.G. & G.R. Harris Funeral Homes
On March 7, 2018, the United States Court of Appeals for the Sixth Circuit (covering Kentucky, Michigan, Ohio and Tennessee) ruled that Title VII of the Civil Rights Act of 1964 prohibits employment discrimination against transgender people under the category of sex. It also ruled that employers may not use the Religious Freedom Restoration Act to justify discrimination against LGBT people. Aimee Stephens, a transgender woman, began working for a funeral home and presented as male. In 2013, she told her boss that she was transgender and planned to transition. She was promptly fired by her boss who said that "gender transition violat[es] God's commands because a person's sex is an immutable God-given fit." With this decision, discrimination in the workplace based on gender identity is now banned in Tennessee. An appeal to the case is set to be heard by the Supreme Court in the 2019 term under R.G. & G.R. Harris Funeral Homes Inc. v. Equal Employment Opportunity Commission.

Hate crime law
Tennessee law has punished hate crime on the basis of sexual orientation since 2001, but the law does not include gender identity, though it is covered by federal law. It was reported by the Tennessee Attorney-General in February 2019 that hate crime laws implicitly cover gender identity, because gender or sex is explicitly covered in Tennessee hate crime legislation - a legal first for a southern US state. However, this is the legal opinion of one political official and it's not officially in law.

Gender identity and expression

Identity documents 
In 1977, the Tennessee state legislature prohibited the state from altering the sex on a birth certificate. According to the Tenn. Code Ann. § 68-3-203(d): “The sex of an individual shall not be changed on the original certificate of birth as a result of sex change surgery."

Athletics 
On March 26, 2021, Governor Bill Lee signed a bill to ban transgender youth from school athletic sports. The bill had passed the Tennessee Senate
on March 1 (the vote was 27-6) and the Tennessee House of Representatives on March 22 (the voice vote was 71-16 with 5 abstentions). The ACLU threatened to sue. Mississippi, Arkansas, Alabama, West Virginia and Idaho have similar laws.

Previous efforts 
When the Tennessee state legislature reconvened in May 2020 during the coronavirus health crisis, the House moved HB 1572 and HB 1689 targeting transgender student athletes. The Senate also had the ability to move SB 1736 (its version of HB 1689), as this had been under consideration before the Legislature adjourned in March.

Medical care 
In March 2020, before the House adjourned during the coronavirus health crisis, it had been considering HB 2576 and HB 2827, targeting medical care for transgender youth. In May 2021, the Governor Bill Lee signed into law effective immediately and passing the Tennessee General Assembly a puberty blockers ban on pre-adolescent children (usually under 13 or 14 years old). Arkansas has a similar law, but it applies to anyone under 18 years old.

In February 2023, the ban was expanded to make it illegal to provide gender-affirming healthcare to any trans person under 18, both in-state and via telehealth from out of state. If Governor Bill Lee signs it, no minors could begin receiving gender-affirming care after July 1, 2023, and minors who had already begun receiving gender-affirming care prior to that date would have that care entirely withdrawn by March 31, 2024. People who receive gender-affirming care as minors and who later regret it will be able to sue their parents, guardians, and physicians.

Bathrooms 

On May 2, 2019, Tennessee governor Bill Lee signed into law legislation defining a trans person using the bathroom corresponding with their gender identity as "indecent exposure." The Tennessee Equality Project had complained about the bill's original language, and although that language was altered before it became law, the organization still believed the bill was harmful to trans people.

In May 2021, another “bathroom bill 2.0” for Tennessee school students and small businesses was passed and signed into law by the Tennessee General Assembly and Tennessee Governor Bill Lee. It banned transgender students from using bathrooms within public schools and required small businesses to post warning signs if they allow transgender people in multiperson bathrooms. Small-business owners faced up to 6 months jail for noncompliance. This went farther than the 2016 North Carolina bathroom law that, due to economic and social damage, North Carolina repealed in 2019. Although Tennessee's law took effect on July 1, 2021, a federal judge placed an injunction on it on July 9 and later struck it down entirely in May 2022, partly on the grounds that it violated business owners' First Amendment rights.

Nashville District Attorney Response 
In May 2021, Nashville Davidson County business owners and citizens learned they would not be subjected to criminal prosecution if they refused to comply with the transgender bathroom sign bill because District Attorney General Glenn Funk said his office would not dedicate any resources to enforcing the legislation he called hateful and harmful.

DA Funk released the following statement about the legislation:

“I believe every person is welcome and valued in Nashville,” Nashville District Attorney General Glenn Funk said in a statement. “Enforcement of transphobic or homophobic laws is contrary to those values. My office will not promote hate.”

Injunction
In July 2021, a federal judge with an injunction immediately stopped the Tennessee "bathroom signs law" within small businesses - from going into legal effect. Other lawsuits and appeals within state and federal courts are pending awaiting outcomes.

Public school bathroom lawsuits
In August 2021, several lawsuits were filed in both state and federal courts and to also "sue the whole state of Tennessee" - to put a stop the enforcement of the public school bathroom law within Tennessee that went into effect on July 1.

Transgender sports and pronouns bans
In April 2022, a further two bills was passed by the Tennessee General Assembly. The Governor of Tennessee Bill Lee is yet to either sign or veto any of the two bills. The first bill legally "bans the usage of student pronouns by teachers within Tennessee school classrooms, and to also prevent any litigation against individuals within courts of the usage of those pronouns" and the second bill legally "bans transgender individuals playing any sports, athletics and/or Olympics within Tennessee colleges" (not just schools, removing a loophole).

Drag performances

In November 2022, the Tennessee General Assembly prefiled a bill to redefine the legal definition of "adult cabaret performance" to ban any "male or female impersonators" from any public property or anywhere they could be seen by someone who's not an adult, under criminal penalty. Instructor Alejandra Caraballo of Harvard Law School was quoted as saying the bill could easily "be applied to trans people for simply existing as themselves", and that "They’re not just going after drag queens, they are trying to criminalize trans and queer people in public spaces". In February 2023, both houses of the state legislature passed the bill, sending it to the governor. Governor Bill Lee has since said he would sign it. During a subsequent protest over the bill, two people - one trans woman, and one drag queen - were arrested by Memphis Police after shouting "Drag is not a crime" and "Bill Lee is a Nazi". The bill has since been signed.

Living conditions
LGBT are often discriminated against, refused service, and beaten. Attackers who fatally wound LGBT people could use the gay/trans panic defense to lower or eliminate punishment. Often police and legal officials are sympathetic towards the anti-LGBT aggressors and turn a blind eye to attacks often calling homosexual attractions a sin.

Mandatory parental permission opt-in law
In April 2021, a bill passed the Tennessee General Assembly that legally requires mandatory parental permission opt-in - before their child or children is being taught about "sexual orientation and gender identity sex education subject curriculum choices and theories" within classrooms in all Tennessee public schools. The Governor of Tennessee Bill Lee signed the bill into law in May 2021 - becomes effective July 1.

Economic impact on Tennessee
In April 2021, it was reported that widespread economic and social impacts on Tennessee could be felt - due to the amount of anti-LGBT bills and laws within Tennessee (like a similar situation back in 2016 within North Carolina regarding the bathroom laws).

Summary table

See also
Recognition of same-sex unions in Tennessee
Tennessee Equality Project
Tennessee Transgender Political Coalition
West Tennessee LGBTQ+ Support LLC

References

External links
Tennessee Transgender Political Coalition

Rights
Tennessee
Politics of Tennessee
Tennessee law